Brei may refer to:


Food
Matzah brei, a porridge of Ashkenazi Jewish origin made from matzah fried with eggs
Schwarzer Brei or Brenntar, a Swabian porridge

People with the surname
Dieter Brei (born 1950), German footballer and trainer
Diann Brei, American mechanical engineer
Douglas Brei (born 1964), American minor league sports executive
Po Krei Brei, 18th-century ruler of Champa

Other uses
"Sweet Porridge", a German fairy tale
Brei Holm, a tiny tidal islet in the western Shetland Islands

See also